Chrysiridia croesus, the East African sunset moth, is a moth of the family Uraniidae. As suggested by its common name, it is found in East Africa, including Kenya, Tanzania, Mozambique and Zimbabwe. The species was first described by Carl Eduard Adolph Gerstaecker in 1871.

Notes

References

"Chrysiridia croesus (Gerstaeker, 1871)". African Moths. Retrieved 25 January 2019.

External links

Uraniidae
Moths of Africa
Moths described in 1871
Insects of Tanzania